The 2015 Ivy League Softball Championship Series was held at Dartmouth Softball Park in Hanover, New Hampshire, the home field of  on May 2, 2015.  The series matched the regular season champions of each of the league's two divisions.  The winner of the series claimed the Ivy League's automatic berth in the 2015 NCAA Division I softball tournament. All games in the series would be broadcast on the Ivy League Digital Network.

 claimed the Rolfe Division title while  won the Gehrig Division, making the third consecutive season Dartmouth and Penn would face off for the right to advance to the NCAA Tournament. In the end Dartmouth would walk away with their second consecutive Ivy League title.

Results
Game One

Game Two

References

Ivy League Championship
Tournament, 2015